was a Japanese actress.

Nogiwa was born in Toyama, Toyama, and grew up in Suginami, Tokyo from the age of three. She graduated from Rikkyo University.

In 1973, she married Sonny Chiba, with whom she co-starred in the TV series Key Hunter. They had a daughter, Juri Manase, in 1975, who later became an actress. Nogiwa and Chiba divorced in 1994.

Nogiwa died from lung cancer on 13 June 2017, at the age of 81.

Filmography

Films
Yakuza Deka (1970) – A singer
Nichiren (1979)
The Battle of Port Arthur (1980) – Shizuko Nogi
Shaso (1989)
Minna no Ie (2001) – Setsuko Iijima
When Will You Return? (2017) – Tomoko Ashimura (present days)

Television
Key Hunter (1967) - Keiko Tsugawa
Onihei Hankachō(1975) -Omasa
The Super Girl (1979) - Yuko Hirose
Hideyoshi (1996) – Omaki no kata
Trick (2000) – Satomi Yamada
Honmamon (2001–2002)
Shinsengumi! (2004) – Kondō Fude
Yasuragi no Sato (2017) – Ryoko Ibuka

Dubbing
Alien (1980 Fuji TV edition) – Ripley (Sigourney Weaver)

References

External links

1936 births
2017 deaths
20th-century Japanese actresses
21st-century Japanese actresses
Japanese film actresses
Japanese television actresses
Japanese television personalities
Japanese television presenters
Rikkyo University alumni
People from Toyama (city)
Japanese women television presenters